The 2001 Baden-Württemberg state election was held on 25 March 2001 to elect the members of the 12th Landtag of Baden-Württemberg. The incumbent coalition government of the Christian Democratic Union (CDU) and Free Democratic Party (FDP) under Minister-President Erwin Teufel was re-elected with an increased majority and continued in office.

Parties
The table below lists parties represented in the previous Landtag of Baden-Württemberg.

Opinion polling

Results

|-
|colspan="8" | 
|-
! colspan="2" | Party
! Votes
! %
! +/-
! Seats 
! +/-
! Seats %
|-
| bgcolor=| 
| align=left | Christian Democratic Union (CDU)
| align=right| 2,029,806
| align=right| 44.8
| align=right| 3.5
| align=right| 63
| align=right| 6
| align=right| 49.2
|-
| bgcolor=| 
| align=left | Social Democratic Party (SPD)
| align=right| 1,508,358
| align=right| 33.3
| align=right| 8.2
| align=right| 45
| align=right| 6
| align=right| 35.1
|-
| bgcolor=| 
| align=left | Free Democratic Party (FDP)
| align=right| 367,580
| align=right| 8.1
| align=right| 1.5
| align=right| 10
| align=right| 4
| align=right| 7.8
|-
| bgcolor=| 
| align=left | Alliance 90/The Greens (Grüne)
| align=right| 350,383
| align=right| 7.7
| align=right| 4.4
| align=right| 10
| align=right| 9
| align=right| 7.8
|-
! colspan=8|
|-
| bgcolor=| 
| align=left | The Republicans (REP)
| align=right| 198,534
| align=right| 4.4
| align=right| 4.7
| align=right| 0
| align=right| 14
| align=right| 0
|-
| bgcolor=|
| align=left | Others
| align=right| 76,102
| align=right| 1.7
| align=right| 1.1
| align=right| 0
| align=right| ±0
| align=right| 0
|-
! align=right colspan=2| Total
! align=right| 4,530,763
! align=right| 100.0
! align=right| 
! align=right| 128
! align=right| 27
! align=right| 
|-
! align=right colspan=2| Voter turnout
! align=right| 
! align=right| 62.6
! align=right| 5.0
! align=right| 
! align=right| 
! align=right| 
|}

Sources
 The Federal Returning Officer

2001 elections in Germany
2001
March 2001 events in Europe